Frederick Lloyd may refer to:
 Frederick Lloyd (actor) (1880–1949), British actor
 Frederick Lloyd (director) (born 1991), British film director
 Frederic Lloyd (1918–1995), English theatre manager
 Frederick Ebenezer Lloyd, Catholic bishop with the American Catholic Church